Lenny Bruce is Dead is the first book by author and radio presenter Jonathan Goldstein.  The story follows a lead character, Josh, through various events in his life, including a death in the family and his exploration of sexuality.  The novel includes multiple themes, such as love, faith, a dysfunctional family, and wavering faith.  Its title is a direct quote of the first line of the song "Lenny Bruce" by Bob Dylan (from his 1981 album Shot of Love).

References

2001 Canadian novels
Novels about dysfunctional families
Cultural depictions of Lenny Bruce
2001 debut novels